The Sinful Nuns of Saint Valentine (/ translation: The Excommunication of St. Valentine) is a 1974 Italian nunsploitation film written and directed by  Sergio Grieco and starring Françoise Prévost and Jenny Tamburi.

Plot 
In the sixteenth century, two Spanish lovers are divided by the rivalry of their families. She then confines herself in a convent, and while the man searches for her, the abbess of the convent falls in love with him, hindering his research and carrying the girl to the Inquisition.

Cast 
Françoise Prévost as The Abbess 
Jenny Tamburi as  Lucita 
Paolo Malco as Esteban
Franco Ressel as Don Alonso - Lucita's father
Corrado Gaipa as Father  Honorio de Mendoza
 Pier Giovanni Anchisi  as Isidro
 Aldina Martano  as Sister Rosario

References

External links

Nunsploitation films
Italian drama films
1974 drama films
1974 films
Films directed by Sergio Grieco
Films set in the 16th century
Films scored by Lallo Gori
1970s Italian films